5025 Mecisteus, provisional designation: , is a larger Jupiter trojan from the Greek camp, approximately  in diameter. The unusual C/X-type Jovian asteroid is possibly a slow rotator with a rotation period of 250 hours. It was discovered on 5 October 1986 by Slovak astronomer Milan Antal at the Toruń Centre for Astronomy in Piwnice, Poland. In 2021, it was named from Greek mythology after the Greek hero Mecisteus who fought in the Trojan War.

Orbit and classification 

Mecisteus is a Jupiter trojan which stays in a 1:1 orbital resonance with Jupiter. It is located in the leading Greek camp at its  Lagrangian point, 60° ahead on its orbit .

It orbits the Sun at a distance of 4.8–5.6 AU once every 11 years and 10 months (4,331 days; semi-major axis of 5.2 AU). Its orbit has an eccentricity of 0.07 and an inclination of 11° with respect to the ecliptic. The body's observation arc begins with its official discovery observation at Piwnice in October 1986.

Numbering and naming 

This minor planet was numbered by the Minor Planet Center on 19 January 1992. On 29 November 2021, IAU's Working Group Small Body Nomenclature  it after Mecisteus, from Greek mythology. Mecisteus was an Achaean warrior during the Trojan War who was killed by the Trojan Polydamas.

Physical characteristics 

Mecisteus is an unusual C-/X-type according to Pan-STARRS survey and the SDSS-based taxonomy, and has a V–I color index of 0.830.

Rotation period 

In November 2009, Stefano Mottola at the Calar Alto Observatory observed Mecisteus in a photometric survey of 80 Jupiter trojans. However, the Collaborative Asteroid Lightcurve Link (CALL) considers the result as incorrect. As of 2018, no secure period has been obtained.

Diameter and albedo 

According to the surveys carried out by the Infrared Astronomical Satellite (IRAS) and the NEOWISE mission of NASA's Wide-field Infrared Survey Explorer, Mecisteus measures 39.84 and 57.83 kilometers in diameter with an albedo of 0.084 and 0.064, respectively. CALL agrees with the results obtained by IRAS, assumes an even lower albedo of 0.0404, and calculates a similar diameter of 57.56 kilometers.

References

External links 
 Asteroid Lightcurve Database (LCDB), query form (info )
 Discovery Circumstances: Numbered Minor Planets (5001)-(10000) – Minor Planet Center
 
 

005025
Discoveries by Milan Antal
Named minor planets
19861005